HMS Valkyrie was a First World War V-class flotilla leader of the Royal Navy.  She was one of two destroyers ordered in July 1916 from William Denny & Bros. Ltd shipyard under the 9th Order for Destroyers of the Emergency War Program of 1916–17.  She was originally to be called HMS Malcolm but was renamed before being completed.  The name Malcolm was later assigned to another destroyer leader.

Construction
In early 1916, the Director of Naval Construction prepared a design for a destroyer leader suitable to lead the new R-class destroyers. The first two ships of the new class, Malcolm and  Montrose were ordered from William Denny and Brothers in April 1916, with three more being ordered from other builders in July that year. Malcolms keel was laid on 25 May 1916 at Denny's shipyard in Dumbarton, Scotland. The five V-class leaders were renamed on 28 September 1916, with Malcolm being renamed Valkyrie and Montrose being renamed . She was launched on 13 March 1917.

She had a displacement of  standard and up to  under full load.

The ship's machinery was based on that of the R-class destroyers which she was designed to lead. Valkyrie reached  during sea trials, with her engines generating .

She shipped four Mk V QF (quick fire) 4-inch L/45 guns in four single center-line mounts.  These were disposed as two forward and two aft in super imposed firing positions.  She also carried one QF 3-inch 20 cwt anti-aircraft gun aft of the second funnel.  Aft of the 3-inch gun, she carried four 21-inch Torpedo tubes mounted in pairs on the center-line.

History
HMS Valkyrie was completed on 16 June 1917 with the pennant number F.83, the first of the V-class leaders to complete. After commissioning Valkyrie joined the 10th Destroyer Flotilla as leader, forming part of the Harwich Force, and carrying out offensive sweeps and convoy escort operations. On 22 December 1917, Valkyrie was part of the escort for a convoy to the Netherlands when she struck a mine. Twelve men were killed, with seven more men dying of wounds in the next few days. Valkyrie was under repair at Chatham Dockyard until July 1918.

After repair, Valkyrie joined the 13th Destroyer Flotilla based at Rosyth Dockyard led by the light cruiser .  In November 1918, following the Armistice that ended fighting with Germany, and the surrender of the German High Seas Fleet, the 13th Destroyer Flotilla, including Valkyrie, was sent to the Baltic sea as part of the British intervention. The 13th Flotilla was relieved in January 1919.  In 1919 she was reassigned to the 3rd Destroyer Flotilla.

In 1921, the destroyer force was again reorganised around smaller flotillas comprising eight destroyers and a leader. Valkyrie was assigned to the 9th Destroyer Flotilla which were laid up at Rosyth Dockyard with skeleton crews. After a refit at Chatham, Valkyrie returned to service in August 1923, operating in British waters with the 9th Flotilla until November 1925, when she, along with the rest of the Flotilla, was transferred to the 7th Destroyer Flotilla and laid up at Port Edgar.

In June 1927, Valkyrie joined the 2nd Destroyer Flotilla of the Mediterranean Fleet as a temporary replacement for  while Valentine was having her boiler tubes replaced. Valkyrie then went back to reserve at Sheerness, where she remained until February 1927, when she was transferred to Rosyth, remaining in reserve.

Disposition
In 1936 she was stricken and sold to the shipbreaking yard Thos. W. Ward's for scrap as part of a deal in which several laid up warships were traded for the old ocean liner , which the Admiralty wanted to convert into a training ship.

Pennant numbers

Notes

References

External links
Valkyrie V Class flotilla leader destroyers
Royal Navy DD pennant numbers

 

V and W-class destroyers of the Royal Navy
Ships built on the River Clyde
1917 ships
World War I destroyers of the United Kingdom